Jessica Villarubin (born May 14, 1996) is a Filipino singer, host, actress and comedienne. She emerged victorious as the Grand Champion of GMA's singing competition The Clash 2020 (Season 3)  and earned the title of Cebuana "Power Diva" of the Philippines, a testament to her incredible singing techniques and unmatched vocal prowess. As an artist under GMA Network, Villarubin is currently seen in its programs All-Out Sundays, as one of the "Diva's of the Queendom".

Life and career

2020: Career beginnings and The Clash Journey 
Hailing from Cebu. Villarubin's humble beginnings as the breadwinner of her family only fueled her determination to chase her dreams. Despite the challenges of the pandemic, she bravely ventured to Manila with the hope of securing a better future for her family through her passion for singing. With her powerful performances and unwavering perseverance, she emerged as the Grand Champion of the Philippine reality singing competition The Clash 2020 (Season 3), solidifying her place as one of the country's most talented and inspiring voices.

In the grand finals of the competition, Villarubin stood tall as she faced off against fellow competitor, Jennie Gabriel, in a heart-stopping one-on-one showdown. With her powerful rendition of Wency Cornejo's "Habang May Buhay" and Jennie's emotive performance of Celine Dion's "All by Myself", the two singers delivered an unforgettable and intense battle for the crown. In the end, Villarubin's exceptional singing techniques and unmatched stamina shone through the competition. In her historic victory, Villarubin not only secured the title of Grand Champion of The Clash 2020 (Season 3) but also walked away with an impressive array of prizes, including an exclusive management contract from GMA Network, a brand new car, one million cash, and a house and lot. As the ultimate celebration of her triumph, she performed her winning song "Ako Naman" which was composed by one of the judges of the show, Christian Bautista, as her debut single. It was a momentous occasion for Villarubin, as it marked her first-ever performance on national television. Her hard work, dedication, and raw talent have truly paid off, as she emerged as one of the most promising singers in the Philippines.

2020- Present: GMA Network's Homegrown Artist

All-Out Sundays: "Diva's of the Queendom" 
Villarubin's is now regularly showcasing her incredible vocal abilities as a mainstay of the popular variety show All-Out Sundays. She shares the stage with a mix of both established and emerging artists. A standout segment in All-Out Sundays is "Diva's of the Queendom" where Villarubin takes the stage alongside some of the most renowned artists in the Philippine music industry, including Julie Anne San Jose, Aicelle Santos, Rita Daniela and the likes of Hannah Precillas, Thea Astley, and Marianne Osabel. Audiences are consistently awestruck by their performances, as they confidently stand out among their peers, cementing their status as highly talented and inspiring singers in the industry.

GMA Shows: Casual Guestings and Performances 
She's casually guesting on various GMA shows such as Sarap' Diba, The Boobay and Tekla Show, and Tiktoclock. She's participating in comedy skits and singing popular songs while taking on new challenges. 

In 2022, Villarubin made a collaboration with Katrina Velarde, as they covered Celine Dion's "I Surrender", which Villarubin also performed in the finals of The Clash. Their cover went viral online.

The Clash 2020 (Season 3) Full Performances

Shows Abroad 
 

 Expo 2020 Dubai

Discography

Filmography

Awards

Notable Youtube Performances

References

External links 
 
 Sparkle profile
 

1996 births
Living people
People from Cebu City
Participants in Philippine reality television series
Reality show winners
Filipino television personalities
GMA Network personalities
GMA Music artists
Filipino women television presenters
Filipino television variety show hosts
Filipino women comedians
Filipino sopranos
Filipino women pop singers
21st-century Filipino women singers
21st-century Filipino actresses
English-language singers from the Philippines
Singers from Manila
Singers from Cebu City
Filipino female models